Lanceolitidae is an extinct family of cephalopods belonging to the Ammonite order Ceratitida and superfamily Noritoidea.

References 
 The Paleobiology Database

Noritoidea
Ceratitida families